Kevin Favela Gómez (born July 19, 1991, in Mexico City) is a professional Mexican footballer who currently plays for Club Celaya

References

External links
 

1991 births
Living people
Mexican footballers
Association football forwards
Albinegros de Orizaba footballers
Irapuato F.C. footballers
La Piedad footballers
C.D. Veracruz footballers
Lobos BUAP footballers
Club Celaya footballers
Ascenso MX players
Liga Premier de México players
Tercera División de México players
Footballers from Mexico City